The Christ of Toledo Parish Church is a Roman Catholic parish church located in the suburban neighbourhood of Villa García, Montevideo, Uruguay.

History
Doroteo Garcia, an owner of wide tracts of land in Villa García, died in 1885. His widow Carolina Lagos decided to build this church as a memorial to her husband. It was built in a historically eclectic style, with a neoclassic facade. Its architect is unknown. It was erected on a hill that can be seen from far away, and was consecrated in 1891. Inside, there is a Carrara marble sculpture of Christ by the sculptor Romairone.

The parish was established on 30 October 1919. The Salesians of Don Bosco now run an oratory devoted to children in a situation of social risk.

References

External links
 Parroquia Cristo de Toledo

1919 establishments in Uruguay
Roman Catholic churches completed in 1891
Roman Catholic church buildings in Montevideo
19th-century Roman Catholic church buildings in Uruguay
Neoclassical church buildings in Uruguay